David Haworth Hill (1851 in Manchester – 30 May 1926) was an Australian civil servant and philatelist who was appointed to the Roll of Distinguished Philatelists in 1921.

References

Australian philatelists
1851 births
1926 deaths
Signatories to the Roll of Distinguished Philatelists
People from Manchester